This is a list of notable Thai restaurants, which specialize in Thai cuisine and dishes:

 Camile – an Irish restaurant chain that serves Thai cuisine
 Eem – Thai barbecue restaurant and cocktail bar in Portland, Oregon
 E-san Thai Cuisine – Portland, Oregon metropolitan area
 Green Elephant Vegetarian Bistro – Portland, Maine in the Art's District
 Hat Yai – Portland, Oregon
 Jay Fai – a street side restaurant in Bangkok, Thailand, it received one star in the inaugural Bangkok 2018 Michelin Guide.
 Kiin Kiin – a Thai cuisine restaurant located in Copenhagen, Denmark. It is one of the few Thai restaurants in the world to receive a Michelin star.
 Langbaan, Portland, Oregon
 Nong's Khao Man Gai, Portland, Oregon
 PaaDee, Portland, Oregon
 Pok Pok – has locations in Portland, Oregon and New York City. Pok Pok NYC received a Michelin star.
 Royal Dragon Restaurant – in Bangkok, Thailand was recorded in the Guinness World Records as the world's largest restaurant in 1992. The  restaurant has seating for 5,000 customers.
 Thai Express – a chain of restaurants serving Thai cuisine. The first restaurant was opened in Holland Village in Singapore in May 2002. Since then, there have been other outlets in Malaysia, Indonesia, Vietnam, Australia, Mongolia, and India (Hyderabad).
 Thaï Express – (commonly spelled Thai Express), a franchise chain of quick service restaurants serving Thai cuisine across Canada
 Thai Square – South East England
 Typhoon, Oregon and Washington, U.S.

See also
 List of Thai dishes
 List of Thai ingredients
 Lists of restaurants
 Restaurants in Thailand (category)
 Thai Town, Los Angeles

References

External links
 

Lists of ethnic restaurants